Persiscape is a genus of funnel weavers first described by Alireza Zamani and Yuri M. Marusik in 2020.

Species
 it contains seven species:
P. caspica Zamani & Marusik, 2020 – Iran
P. caucasica (Guseinov, Marusik & Koponen, 2005) – Greece, Turkey, Georgia, Azerbaijan
P. ecbatana Zamani & Marusik, 2020 – Iran
P. gideoni (Levy, 1996) – Turkey, Georgia, Azerbaijan, Israel, Iran
P. levyi (Guseinov, Marusik & Koponen, 2005) – Azerbaijan, Iran
P. nassirkhanii Zamani & Marusik, 2020 – Iran
P. zagrosensis Zamani & Marusik, 2020 – Iran

See also
 List of Agelenidae species

References

Further reading

Agelenidae genera